Justin Davis Valentin (born 14 April 1971) is a Seychellois politician and teacher. In 2018, he was appointed Vice-Chancellor of the University of Seychelles. As of 3 November 2020, he serves as the Minister of Education and Human Resources Development, succeeding Jeanne Siméon.

Biography
Valentin received his diploma in education from Seychelles Polytechnic. He continued his studies in Australia, and graduated with a Bachelor of Education from the Edith Cowan University, followed by a master's degree from Universiti Sains Malaysia, and a doctorate from King's College London. He specialised in science and mathematics. He first worked as a teacher and continued his career as a researcher at the Ministry of Education.

In 1993, Valentin published Testanman Rezete, a novel written in Seychellois Creole, the French-based creole language spoken in the Seychelles.

In 2013, Valentin became the Dean for Business and Law of the University of Seychelles. On 2 February 2018, he was appointed Vice-Chancellor of the university.

On 30 October 2020, he was elected Minister of Education and Human Resources Development.

Bibliography
 Testanman Rezete (1993. Lenstiti Kreol) (in Seychellois Creole)
 Enn ti zafer pour Marmay (2001. Lenstiti Kreol)  (Children's book in Seychellois Creole)

References

1971 births
Living people
Government ministers of Seychelles
University of Seychelles
Seychellois educators
Seychellois writers
Writers in Seychellois Creole
Alumni of King's College London
Edith Cowan University alumni
Universiti Sains Malaysia alumni